K17MJ-D (channel 51) is a low-power television station San Antonio, Texas, United States, affiliated with beIN Sports Xtra and owned by HC2 Holdings. It is not yet available on Charter Spectrum.

History
This station began its broadcasts as K52EA in 1991 as an independent station. It picked up the Multimedios network in early 2006 and moved to channel 51 in December of that same year, changing its call sign to K51JF.

In June 2013, K51JF was slated to be sold to Landover 5 LLC as part of a larger deal involving 51 other low-power television stations; the sale fell through in June 2016.

The station was issued its license for digital broadcasting on channel 17 on August 29, 2017, changing its call sign to K17MJ-D.

Mintz Broadcasting sold the station to HC2 Holdings in 2017.

Subchannels
The station's signal is multiplexed:

References

External links

Television channels and stations established in 1991
1991 establishments in Texas
17MJ-D
Low-power television stations in the United States